Lucas "Masterpieces" Moripe Stadium is a multi-purpose stadium having a capacity of 28,900 and is located in Atteridgeville, a township of Pretoria, South Africa. It is currently used mostly for football matches and serves as part-time home stadium of Premier Soccer League club Supersport United.

The stadium was named after former local soccer player Lucas Moripe. Until 2010 the stadium was known as Super Stadium.

The Germany national football team used it as a training venue during the 2010 FIFA World Cup.

References

External links
Stadium picture
Stadium images
Photos of Stadiums in South Africa at cafe.daum.net/stade

Soccer venues in South Africa
Buildings and structures in Pretoria
Sports venues in Pretoria
SuperSport United F.C.